Pierre Brocheux (18 May 1931 – 25 December 2022) was a Vietnamese-French historian and editor. He specialized in the history of Vietnam and of French Indochina.

Biography
Brocheux was born in Cholon (nowadays Ho Chi Minh City) in French Indochina on 18 May 1931 to a French father and a Vietnamese-French mother. He attended primary and secondary school in Saigon and Paris. A certified professor, he taught history and geography to secondary school students in Saigon from 1960 to 1968. He then taught the same subject at a secondary technical school in Vitry-sur-Seine from 1968 to 1970.

Brocheux earned a doctorate in history from the School for Advanced Studies in the Social Sciences in 1969. Afterwards, he worked as a lecturer at Paris Diderot University from 1970 to 1997. From 1989 to 2001, he was editor-in-chief of Revue de l'histoire des colonies françaises. In 1994, he co-founded the Association française des chercheurs sur l'Asie du Sud-Est, of which he served as president from 1994 to 1997.

Brocheux died on 25 December 2022, at the age of 91.

Publications
Histoire de l'Asie du Sud-Est : révoltes, réformes et révolutions (1981)
Indochine, la colonisation ambiguë (1995)
Hô Chi Minh (2000)
Viet Nam Exposé.French Scholarship on Twentieth Century Vietnamese Society (2002)
Hô Chi Minh, du révolutionnaire à l’icône (2003)
Une histoire économique du Viet Nam : 1850-2007 : la palanche et le camion (2009)
The Mekong Delta. Ecology, Economy and Revolution. 1860-1960 (2009)
Histoire du Vietnam contemporain : la nation résiliente (2011)
Les décolonisations au XXe siècle : la fin des empires européens et japonais (2012)

References

1931 births
2022 deaths
French historians
Academic staff of Paris Diderot University
People from Saigon